The Eastern Washington Eagles women's basketball team represents Eastern Washington University in Cheney, Washington. The team competes in the Big Sky Conference.

History
Eastern Washington began Division I play in 1982. They have made just one NCAA Tournament appearance (1987), which occurred after they won the Mountain West Athletic Conference (MWAC) tournament, which remains their only tournament title. They have made the WNIT in 2010, 2013, and 2015. As of the end of the 2019–20 season, the Eagles have an all-time record of 484–601.

Postseason

NCAA tournament results
The Eagles have appeared in one NCAA tournament. Their record is 0–1.

WNIT results
The Eagles have appeared in the Women's National Invitation Tournament (WNIT) three times. Their combined record is 1–3.

WBI results
The Eagles have appeared in one Women's Basketball Invitational (WBI). Their record is 1–1.

AIAW College Division/Division II
The Eagles made two appearances in the AIAW National Division II basketball tournament, with a combined record of 0–2.

Awards
Big Sky Most Valuable Player
 Julie Piper – 2010
 Brianne Ryan – 2012

Big Sky Coach of the Year
 Wendy Schuller – 2010

Big Sky Defensive Player of the Year
 Michelle Demetruk – 2003
 Joanna Chadd – 2006
 Brianne Ryan – 2010

Big Sky Freshman of the Year
 Kari Schwenke – 1992
 Kristy Missall – 1993
 Hayley Hodgins – 2013
 Delaney Hodgins – 2015

Awards information comes from the 2016–2017 Big Sky Conference media guide.

References

External links